In the area of mathematics known as Ramsey theory, a Ramsey class is one which satisfies a generalization of Ramsey's theorem.

Suppose  is a class of structures closed under isomorphism and substructures. We say the class  has the A-Ramsey property if for ever positive integer  and for every  there is a  such that  holds. If  has the -Ramsey property for all  then we say  is a Ramsey class.

Ramsey's theorem is equivalent to the statement that the class of all finite sets is a Ramsey class.

References

Ramsey theory